Safar Naeimi Raz (born 1959) is an Iranian politician.

Naeimi was born in Raz, Ardabil. He was a member of the 9th Islamic Consultative Assembly from the electorate of Astara. and vice chairman of Iran-Azerbaijan Friendship society. Naeimi  won with 24,062 (50.33%) votes.

Electoral history

References

People from Astara, Iran
People from Ardabil
Deputies of Astara, Iran
Living people
1959 births
Members of the 9th Islamic Consultative Assembly
Followers of Wilayat fraction members
Mojahedin of the Islamic Revolution Organization politicians
Islamic Revolutionary Guard Corps second brigadier generals
Islamic Azad University, Central Tehran Branch alumni